Evansville Brewing Company is a historic brewery located in downtown Evansville, Indiana. It was built between 1891 and 1893, and is a four-story, Romanesque Revival style brick building.

It was listed on the National Register of Historic Places in 1982.

See also
 List of defunct breweries in the United States

References

Defunct brewery companies of the United States
Industrial buildings and structures on the National Register of Historic Places in Indiana
Romanesque Revival architecture in Indiana
Industrial buildings completed in 1893
Buildings and structures in Evansville, Indiana
National Register of Historic Places in Evansville, Indiana